George Vincent Kenneally Jr. (December 29, 1929 – January 11, 1999) was an American lawyer and politician who served in the Massachusetts General Court and was legal counsel to the Massachusetts Senate.

Early life
Kenneally was born on December 29, 1929, in Boston. His father, George Kenneally, was a National Football League player and a teacher and coach at Revere High School. Kenneally graduated from The English High School, Northeastern University, and Suffolk University Law School.

Political career
Kenneally first ran for the Massachusetts House of Representatives at the age of 22. After two unsuccessful attempts, he was elected in 1956. From 1963 to 1971 he was a member of the Massachusetts Senate. In 1973, Kenneally and Robert H. Quinn cosponsored legislation that helped create the University of Massachusetts Boston.

Legal career
In 1971, Kenneally resigned to become the associate legal counsel of the Massachusetts Senate. He served as acting legal counsel from 1984 until his retirement on July 1, 1991. He died on January 11, 1999, after suffering a heart attack at his vacation home in West Palm Beach, Florida. He was 69 years old.

References

1929 births
1999 deaths
Democratic Party members of the Massachusetts House of Representatives
Massachusetts lawyers
Democratic Party Massachusetts state senators
Northeastern University alumni
People from Dorchester, Massachusetts
Suffolk University Law School alumni